Pseudomusonia maculosa is a species of praying mantis native to French Guiana.

See also
List of mantis genera and species

References

Mantidae
Mantodea of South America
Insects described in 1912